Mount French may refer to:

 Mount French (Queensland), a mountain in Queensland, Australia
 Mount French, Queensland, a locality in Queensland, Australia
 Mount French (Alberta), a mountain in Alberta, Canada